Donore Harriers is an athletics club founded in 1893. It is located in Chapelizod, Dublin.

Originally based in South Circular Road and then Islandbridge, the club moved to a modern clubhouse opposite the Chapelizod Gate to the Phoenix Park in 1993.

A new 300m polyurethane running track and athletics field was built on the club grounds in the autumn of 2007.

Olympic Games representatives 
 1948 London: J.P. Reardon, C. Clancy
 1956 Melbourne: E. Kinsella
 1960 Rome: Bertie Messitt, W. Dunne
 1964 Tokyo: B. Clifford, T. O’Riordan
 1976 Montreal: Jim McNamara, E. Coghlan
 1980 Moscow: E. Coghlan, S. Egan
 1996 Atlanta: Roman Linscheid

European Athletics Championships representatives 
 1954: Berne: E. Kinsella, B. O’Reilly
 1958: Stockholm: B. Messitt
 1962: Belgrade: B. Messitt
 1966: Budapest: T. O’Riordan, J. McNamara
 1974: Rome: E. Coghlan
 1978: Prague: E. Coghlan
 1982: Athens: S. Egan
 1990: Split: V. McGovern
 1998: Budapest: R. Linscheid
 2014: Zurich: J. Travers

See also 
 Brendan Hackett, a member

References

External links
  of Donore Harriers

Athletics in Dublin (city)
1893 establishments in Ireland